Chan Yung-jan was the defending champion, but decided not to participate.

Peng Shuai won the title, defeating Ayumi Morita 6–1, 6–4 in the final.

Seeds

Draw

Finals

Top half

Bottom half

References 
http://itftennis.com/procircuit/tournaments/women's-tournament/info.aspx?tournamentid=1100022997

OEC Taipei Ladies Open
Taipei WTA Ladies Open